Rosa Turich (born Rosa Sinohui, June 9, 1903 – November 20, 1998) was an American film and television actress.

Turich was married to Felipe Turich, a comedian, with whom she did a comedy act in Los Angeles. They had three children.

On November 20, 1998, Turich died in Santa Ana, California, after having had two strokes.

Filmography

References

Bibliography
 Pitts, Michael R. Western Movies: A Guide to 5,105 Feature Films. McFarland, 2012.

External links
 
 

1903 births
1998 deaths
American film actresses
American television actresses
20th-century American actresses